Mordellistena maroccana is a species of beetle is the family Mordellidae.

References

maroccana
Beetles described in 1854